The Shore Nuisances (Bombay and Kolaba) Act, 1853 is a law which was enacted for large sea-shore in the islands with a view to the safe navigation of the harbour, and to facilitate the removal of nuisances, obstructions and encroachments below high-water mark in harbour, or upon or about the shores of islands in Mumbai (formerly Bombay) in former British India.

References 

Law of India
1853 in India
1853 in law